was the 10th head of a cadet branch of the Japanese imperial family and a career officer in the Imperial Japanese Navy.

Early life
Prince Takehito was born in Kyoto as a scion of the  house, one of the shinnōke branches of the Imperial Family of Japan, which were eligible to succeed to the Chrysanthemum Throne in the event that the main line should die out. Prince Takehito is born to Prince Arisugawa Takahito and Noriko Mori; a concubine. As he was born when the country was still under rule by the Tokugawa Bakufu, he was sent as a youth into the Buddhist priesthood, and assigned to serve at the monzeki temple of Myōhō-in in Kyoto. After the Meiji Restoration, he was recalled to secular life, and relocated to Tokyo in 1871.

Naval and diplomatic career
In 1874, on orders from Emperor Meiji, Arisugawa enrolled in the Imperial Japanese Naval Academy. In 1877, despite his youth, he was sent as an observer to the Satsuma Rebellion, to observe the devastation first hand, and landed in Kagoshima shortly after it was secured by Imperial forces.

In 1879, Arisugawa was sent as a military attaché to Great Britain and embarked upon , the flagship of Britain's Royal Navy in the Far East, for further training. He served in the Channel Squadron for a year before returning to Japan as an ensign.

In 1880, shortly after his wedding, Arisugawa was again sent to England, this time as a cadet at the Royal Naval College, Greenwich. He returned to Japan in June 1883. Arisugawa and Maeda Yasuko, his wife made an extensive tour of Europe and America in 1889.

Arisugawa’s first naval command was that of the corvette  in early 1890, and his next was the cruiser  later that year.

In 1891, Arisugawa was assigned to the escort of Russian Crown Prince Nikolai (later Tsar Nicholas II) during his tour of Japan. However, while he was in the Prince's charge Nikolai was wounded in an assassination attempt, called the Otsu Scandal, which led to a considerable worsening of diplomatic relations between Japan and Russia.
 
In 1892, Arisugawa was posted as captain of the cruiser . He succeeded to the Arisugawa-no-miya title upon the death of his half-brother, Prince Arisugawa Taruhito, on January 15, 1895.

During the First Sino-Japanese War (1894–95), Arisugawa commanded the cruiser  and subsequently the cruiser  in combat. He attained the rank of rear admiral on November 11, 1896. In 1896, he travelled to England again to represent Emperor Meiji at the Diamond Jubilee celebrations for Queen Victoria.

Arisugawa advanced to the rank of vice admiral on September 26, 1899.

King Edward VII appointed Arisugawa an Honorary Knight Grand Cross in the civil division of the Most Honorable Order of the Bath (GCB) in the November 1902 Birthday Honours list published on the British King′s birthday.

Promoted to full admiral on June 28, 1905, Meiji appointed the prince a member of the Order of the Golden Kite (3rd Class) for his service during the Russo-Japanese War. He visited Europe again in 1905, when he and his wife represented the Emperor at the wedding of the German Crown Prince Wilhelm (1882–1951) to Duchess Cecile of Mecklenburg-Schwerin. They visited Great Britain again on their way back to Japan.

Final years
Of weak constitution since childhood, Arisugawa took frequent medical leaves during his naval career. He built a summer home in Kobe and went into semi-retirement in 1909. He died on July 3, 1913 at his Kobe residence. However, news of his death was not made immediately public, and his body was rushed back to his palace in Kōjimachi, Tokyo by a specially chartered train, and his death formally announced on July 10, 1913.

He advanced to the honorary rank of marshal admiral on July 7, 1913, which was after his actual death, but before his "official death date", so the award was not considered posthumous. However, he was also awarded the Collar of the Supreme Order of the Chrysanthemum posthumously.

Marriage and family
On December 11, 1880, Arisugawa married Maeda Yasuko (March 15, 1864 – June 30, 1923), the fourth daughter of Maeda Yoshiyasu, the last daimyō of Kaga Domain (modern Ishikawa prefecture), by whom he had three children.

 
 
 ; married Prince Tokugawa Yoshihisa; their daughter was Kikuko, Princess Takamatsu.

Since the prince died without a male heir (his son, Tanehito, having died of appendicitis in 1908 while attending the Imperial Japanese Naval Academy at Etajima, Hiroshima), the direct line of descent of the house of Arisugawa-no-miya became extinct.

However, his boyhood friend Prince Yoshihito, Emperor Taishō, revived the house (which reverted to its original name of Takamatsu-no-miya) in favor of his third son, Prince Takamatsu Nobuhito. Prince Nobuhito subsequently married Kikuko Tokugawa, a granddaughter of Prince Arisugawa Takehito.

Memorials
The site of Arisugawa’s Tokyo palace is now the Arisugawa-no-miya Memorial Park. It is located in Minami Azabu, Minato, Tokyo and its extensive gardens are open to the public. The site of his seaside summer home in Hayama, Kanagawa Prefecture is now the site of the annex of the Kanagawa Prefectural Museum of Modern Art
Arisugawa’s summer villa in Inawashiro, Fukushima, the Tenkyōkaku (which he personally designed) is an Important Cultural Properties of Japan and is open to the public as a museum. On the grounds is a large standing bronze statue of Prince Arisugawa, formerly located at the Naval Staff College in Tsukiji, Tokyo.

References

Books

Jansen, Marius B. The Making of Modern Japan. Cambridge: The Belknap Press of Harvard University Press, 2000.

External links

Notes

1862 births
1913 deaths
People from Kyoto
Japanese princes
Arisugawa-no-miya
Graduates of the Royal Naval College, Greenwich
Imperial Japanese Navy marshal admirals
Japanese military personnel of the First Sino-Japanese War
Japanese military personnel of the Russo-Japanese War
People of Meiji-period Japan
Recipients of the Order of the Golden Kite
Recipients of the Order of the Netherlands Lion
Knights Grand Cross of the Order of Saints Maurice and Lazarus
Grand Croix of the Légion d'honneur
Honorary Knights Grand Cross of the Order of the Bath